The Congress Party Alliance (CPA) is a political party in Taiwan. The party was established on 18 October 2018 during its inaugural meeting in Taipei City. The Central Party Department is located in the Zhongzheng District of Taipei City. The CPA elected Wujue Miaotian as the first party chairman at the first National Party Congress, and the party was approved by the Ministry of the Interior on 29 November of the same year. The Minkuotang merged into the CPA on 25 January 2019, becoming the first instance of a political party merger in the history of the Republic of China.

See also 
 List of political parties in Taiwan

References 

2018 establishments in Taiwan
Defunct political parties in Taiwan
Political parties established in 2018
Conservative parties in Taiwan
2020 disestablishments in Taiwan
Political parties disestablished in 2020